John Charles McNicol Turnbull (30 December 1885 – 2 May 1917) was the first Australian rules footballer with autism, who played with South Melbourne in the Victorian Football League.

Family
The son of Charles William Turnbull (1862–1912), and Agnes Turnbull (1861–1915), née McNicol, John Charles McNicol Turnbull was born at Horsham, Victoria on 30 December 1885.

He married Mary Ellen Adams (1890–1974) in 1912.

Football
He played 12 games for South Melbourne First XVIII in 1908;  and, after this short VFL career, he returned to the bush and settled in Ballarat.

Military  service
Employed as a bricklayer, he enlisted in the First AIF, and left Australia for overseas service on the HMAT Ascanius (A11) on 27 May 1916.

Death
He was severely wounded in action on the Western Front on 30 April 1917, and died of his wounds on 2 May 1917.

Buried at the Trois Arbres Cemetery, at Steenwerck in Northern France, he left a widow and five children, one of whom was born after he left for overseas service.

See also
 List of Victorian Football League players who died in active service

Footnotes

References
 Holmesby, Russell & Main, Jim (2007). The Encyclopedia of AFL Footballers. 7th ed. Melbourne: Bas Publishing.
 Main, J. & Allen, D., "Turnbull, Jack", pp. 186–190 in Main, J. & Allen, D., Fallen – The Ultimate Heroes: Footballers Who Never Returned From War, Crown Content, (Melbourne), 2002. 
 First World War Embarkation Roll: Private John Charles McNicol Turnbull (241), collection of the Australian War Memorial.
 World War One Service Record: Private John Charles McNicol Turnbull (241), National Archives of Australia.
 Roll of Honour Circular: Private John Charles McNicol Turnbull (241), collection of the Australian War Memorial.
 Roll of Honour: Private John Charles McNicol Turnbull (241), Australian War Memorial.
 Australian Casualties: List No.301: Died of Wounds: Victoria (Turnbull, J.C.M., Horsham, 2/5/17), The Argus, (Tuesday 22 May 1917), p.9.
 Deaths: Australians on Service: Killed: Turnbull, The Argus, (Thursday 24 May 1917), p.6.

External links
 
 

1885 births
1917 deaths
Australian rules footballers from Victoria (Australia)
Sydney Swans players
Williamstown Football Club players
Horsham Football Club players
Australian military personnel killed in World War I